The 70r Red Army Soldier error or RSFSR 70r error of 1922 is one of the rarest postage stamps issued by Soviet Russia. Due to the double printing error, one cliché of the imperforate 25-stamp sheet has a 70-ruble value instead of the correct 100-ruble. Only four intact complete sheets are known.

Description 
The sheets contain 25 imperforate 100-ruble orange stamps depicting the Red Army soldier that appeared in the RSFSR 1922 Workers and Soldiers definitive issue. The twelfth stamp in the sheet has a denomination of 70 rubles, unlike all the others, which have a face value of 100 rubles.

Rarity 
Only four complete sheets of 25 exist, including one in the state collection of the  A.S. Popov Central Museum of Communications in Saint Petersburg, Russia. As promoted by the Museum, "the celebrated Red Army Soldier of the 1922–23 standard issue is a well known world class rarity."

These standout items are dubbed as "one of the greatest rarities in Russian philately". They represent "one of the treasures of Russian philately in general and certainly an important highlight of Russian Soviet Federative Republic collection."

On 20 February 2014, Cherrystone Auctions in New York City offered one complete Red Army Soldier sheet, among the items of the Igor Gorski specialised collection of Russia that contained many errors and unique varieties of the RSFSR period. It was sold for $126,500.

See also 
 Definitive stamps of Russia
 Definitive stamps of the Soviet Union
 Errors, freaks, and oddities
 First USSR stamps
 Gold Standard issue
 List of postage stamps
 Postage stamps and postal history of Russia
 Soviet and post-Soviet postage rates
 Soviet Union stamp catalogue

References

Further reading

External links 
 

Postage stamps
Postage stamps of the Soviet Union
1922 introductions
Postage stamps depicting people